The Microvision (aka Milton Bradley Microvision or MB Microvision) is the first handheld game console that used interchangeable cartridges and in that sense is reprogrammable. It was released by the Milton Bradley Company in November 1979 for a retail price of $49.99.

The Microvision was designed by Jay Smith, the engineer who would later design the Vectrex gaming console. The Microvision's combination of portability and a cartridge-based system led to moderate success, with Smith Engineering grossing $15 million in the first year of the system's release. However, very few cartridges, a small screen, and a lack of support from established home video game companies led to its demise in 1981. According to Satoru Okada, the former head of Nintendo's R&D1 Department, the Microvision gave birth to Game Boy, the follow up to Game & Watch, after Nintendo designed around Microvision's limitations.

Production

Unlike most later consoles, the Microvision did not contain an onboard processor (CPU). Instead, each game included its own processor contained within the removable cartridge. This meant that the console itself effectively consisted of the controls, LCD panel and LCD controller.

The processors for the first Microvision cartridges were made with both Intel 8021 (cross licensed by Signetics) and Texas Instruments TMS1100 processors. Due to purchasing issues, Milton Bradley switched to using TMS1100 processors exclusively including reprogramming the games that were originally programmed for the 8021 processor. The TMS1100 was a more primitive device, but offered more memory and lower power consumption than the 8021. First-revision Microvisions needed two batteries due to the 8021's higher power consumption, but later units (designed for the TMS1100) only had one active battery holder. Even though the battery compartment was designed to allow the two 9-volt batteries to be inserted with proper polarity of positive and negative terminals, when a battery was forcefully improperly oriented, while the other battery was properly oriented, the two batteries would be shorted and they would overheat. The solution was to remove terminals for one of the batteries to prevent this hazard. Due to the high cost of changing production molds, Milton Bradley did not eliminate the second battery compartment, but instead removed its terminals and called it a spare battery holder.

Problems

Microvision units and cartridges are now somewhat rare. Those that are still in existence are susceptible to three main problems: "screen rot," ESD damage, and keypad destruction.

Screen rot
The manufacturing process used to create the Microvision's LCD was primitive by modern standards. Poor sealing and impurities introduced during manufacture have resulted in the condition known as screen rot. The liquid crystal spontaneously leaks and permanently darkens, resulting in a game unit that still plays but is unable to properly draw the screen. While extreme heat (such as resulting from leaving the unit in the sun), which can instantly destroy the screen, can be avoided, there is nothing that can be done to prevent screen rot in most Microvision systems.

ESD damage
A major design problem on early units involves the fact that the microprocessor (which is inside the top of each cartridge) lacks ESD protection and is directly connected to the copper pins which normally connect the cartridge to the Microvision unit. If the user opens the protective sliding door that covers the pins, the processor can be exposed to any electric charge the user has built up. If the user has built up a substantial charge, the discharge can jump around the door's edge or pass through the door itself (dielectric breakdown). The low-voltage integrated circuit inside the cartridge is extremely ESD sensitive, and can be destroyed by an event of only a few dozen volts which cannot even be felt by the person, delivering a fatal shock to the game unit. This phenomenon was described in detail by John Elder Robison (a former Milton Bradley engineer) in his book Look Me in the Eye; Robinson described the issue as having been a significant enough issue during the 1979 holiday season (with up to 60% of units being returned as defective) that it resulted in significant panic among Milton Bradley staff and required extensive modifications to both later Microvision units and Microvision factories (the former being of his own design) to better dispel stray static charges.

Keypad destruction
The Microvision unit had a twelve-button keypad, with the switches buried under a thick layer of flexible plastic. To align the user's fingers with the hidden buttons, the cartridges had cutouts in their bottom (over the keypad). As different games required different button functions, the cutouts were covered with a thin printed piece of plastic, which identified the buttons' functions in that game. The problem with this design is that pressing on the buttons stretched the printed plastic, resulting in the thin material stretching and eventually tearing. Having long fingernails exacerbated the condition.  Many of the initial games were programmed to give feedback of the keypress when the key was released instead of when the key was pressed.  As a result, users may press on the keypad harder because they are not being provided with any feedback that the key has been pressed.  This resulted from a keypad used for prototyping being different from the production keypad; the prototyping keypad had tactile feedback upon key pressing that the production units lacked.

Technical specifications

 CPU: Intel 8021/TI TMS1100 (on cartridge)
 Screen type and resolution: 16 × 16 pixel LCD
 Register width: 4 bit (TMS1100), 8 bit (8021)
 Processor speed: 100 kHz
RAM (integrated into CPU): 64 bytes
ROM: 2K (TMS100), 1K (8021)
 Cartridge ROM: 2K (TMS 1100), 1K (8021) masked (integrated into CPU; each game's CPU was different)
 Video Display Processor: LCD Custom Driver (made by Hughes)
 Sound: Piezo beeper
 Input: Twelve button keypad, one paddle
 Power requirements: One or two 9 volt batteries on earlier Microvision consoles, one 9 volt battery on later Microvision consoles
 Power Dissipation: 110 mW (TMS 1100), 1 W (8021)

Games
While the game cartridge plastic cases were beige colored in the USA, in Europe they came in a variety of different colors, and the games were numbered on the Box. The age range in Europe for the console and its games was from 8 to 80 years old or 8 to Adult.

There were  titles known to have been released.

In popular culture 
The Microvision was featured in Friday the 13th Part 2 (1981).

Reviews
1980 Games 100 in Games
 1981 Games 100 in Games

See also
 Mattel Auto Race
 Vectrex

References

 
Handheld game consoles
Monochrome video game consoles
Products introduced in 1979
1970s toys
Milton Bradley Company games
Discontinued handheld game consoles